Dust lichens are lichens in either the genus Chrysothrix or genus Lepraria.

References

Lichenology